Obba is a genus of air-breathing land snails in the subfamily Camaeninae of the family Camaenidae.

Species
Species within the genus Obba include:
 Obba basidentata (L. Pfeiffer, 1857)
 Obba bigonia (Férussac, 1823)
 Obba bulacanensis (Hidalgo, 1888)
 Obba bustoi (Hidalgo, 1887)
 Obba calcar (Martens, 1864)
 Obba camelus (L. Pfeiffer, 1855)
 Obba columbaria (G. B. Sowerby I, 1841)
 Obba flavopicta (Quadras & Möllendorff, 1894)
 Obba gallinula (L. Pfeiffer, 1845)
 Obba hemiodon (Möllendorff, 1898)
 Obba horizontalis (L. Pfeiffer, 1845)
 Obba kochiana (Möllendorff, 1888)
 Obba lasallii (Eydoux, 1838)
 Obba listeri (Gray, 1825)
 Obba livesayi (L. Pfeiffer, 1860)
 Obba louiseae Thach, 2016
 Obba marginata (Müller, 1774)
 Obba marmorata (Möllendorff, 1898)
 Obba mesai Bartsch, 1939
 Obba moricandi (L. Pfeiffer, 1842)
 Obba morongensis (Möllendorff, 1889)
 Obba papilla (Müller, 1774)
 Obba parmula (Broderip, 1841)
 Obba planulata (Lamarck, 1822)
 Obba platyzona (Möllendorff, 1890)
 Obba quoyi (Deshayes, 1838)
 Obba reeveana (L. Pfeiffer, 1846)
 Obba rota (Broderip, 1841)
 Obba saranganica (Hidalgo, 1887)
 Obba scrobiculata (L. Pfeiffer, 1842)
 Obba subhorizontalis (Möllendorff, 1894)
 Obba viridiflava (Möllendorff, 1894)
Species brought into synonymy
 Obba heroica (L. Pfeiffer, 1855): synonym of Obba papilla (Müller, 1774) (superseded combination)
 Obba lasallei (Eydoux, 1838): synonym of Obba lasallii (Eydoux, 1838) (invalid: incorrect subsequent spelling)

References

 Bank, R. A. (2017). Classification of the Recent terrestrial Gastropoda of the World. Last update: July 16th, 2017

External links
 Beck, H. (1837). Index molluscorum praesentis aevi musei principis augustissimi Christiani Frederici. 1-124. Hafniae
 Morgan J. de. (1885). Mollusques terrestres & fluviatiles du Royaume de Pérak et des pays voisins (Presqu'ile Malaise). Bulletin de la Société Zoologique de France. 10: 353-428.
 Semper, C. (1870-1885). Reisen im Archipel der Philippinen, Theil 2. Wissenschaftliche Resultate. Band 3, Landmollusken. Wiesbaden: Kreidel.
 Hartmann, J.D.W. (1840-1844). Erd- und Süsswasser-Gasteropoden der Schweiz. Mit Zugabe einiger merkwürdigen exotischen Arten, i-xx, 1-36, pl. 1-2
 Albers, J. C. (1850). Die Heliceen nach natürlicher Verwandtschaft systematisch geordnet. Berlin: Enslin. 262 pp

Camaenidae